Mai Sayavongs (born June 5, 1962 Houaphanh Province) is a Laotian ambassador who has served as ambassador to the United States since August 3, 2015.  He has concurrent accreditation to Canada and Mexico.

He earned a MA in international relations from the Moscow State Institute of International Relations in 1988 and another MA, in Asia and international studies from Griffith University in Brisbane, Australia, in 1996.

References

Ambassadors of Laos to the United States
Ambassadors of Laos to Canada
Ambassadors of Laos to Mexico
Moscow State Institute of International Relations alumni
Griffith University alumni
1962 births
Living people